Leptojulis is a genus of wrasses native to the Indian Ocean and the western Pacific Ocean.

Species
The currently recognized species in this genus are:
 Leptojulis chrysotaenia J. E. Randall & Ferraris, 1981 (ochreband wrasse)
 Leptojulis cyanopleura (Bleeker, 1853) (shoulderspot wrasse)
 Leptojulis lambdastigma J. E. Randall & Ferraris, 1981
 Leptojulis polylepis J. E. Randall, 1996 (smallscale wrasse)
 Leptojulis urostigma J. E. Randall, 1996 (tailmark wrasse)

References

Labridae
Marine fish genera
Taxa named by Pieter Bleeker